Angel Bastunov (born 18 May 1999) is a Bulgarian professional footballer who plays as a midfielder for CSKA 1948 Sofia.

References

External links

1999 births
Living people
Bulgarian footballers
First Professional Football League (Bulgaria) players
Botev Plovdiv players
FC Kariana Erden players
FC CSKA 1948 Sofia players
Association football midfielders
People from Razlog
Sportspeople from Blagoevgrad Province